Tomis was a fort in the Roman province of Moesia. According to Tabula Peutingeriana it is situated between Stratonis and Histriopolis.

See also
List of castra

External links
Roman castra from Romania - Google Maps / Earth

Notes

Roman legionary fortresses in Romania
History of Dobruja